The Dialectic and Philanthropic Societies, commonly known as DiPhi or The Societies, are the original collegiate debating societies at the University of North Carolina at Chapel Hill, and together comprise the oldest student organization at the University, as well as the oldest public student organization in the United States. During the academic year, the Societies hold regular meetings at 7:30 PM on Mondays in the Dialectic Chamber at the top of the New West Building. The Societies also hold occasional social events in the Philanthropic Chamber at the top of New East Building.

History 

The Dialectic Society (originally known as the Debating Society) was established in 1795, making DiPhi the oldest student organization at any public university in the United States.  They adopted the motto "Virtus et Scientia." The members stated as their goals: "...to promote useful Knowledge..." and "...to cultivate a lasting Friendship with each other..." It is significant that the first order of business for the Debating Society was an order for the purchase of books.  Indeed, as the University had no library, the Debating Society's collection became the primary resource for the University, later becoming the core of the school's library.

One month after the founding of the Debating Society, the Philanthropic Society (originally known as the Concord Society) split off due to strict rules and political disagreements.  It took a new motto, "Virtus, Libertas, et Scientia", with the addition of the word Libertas lending some insight into the reasons for splitting. In 1796 the two societies adopted the Greek equivalents of their names, becoming the Dialectic Society and the Philanthropic Society, known as the Di and the Phi for short. Due to the common use of the shortened form, "Philanthropic" is properly pronounced with a long "i" in the first syllable.

In the early days of the University, students were required to join one of the two societies, and the rivalry between the two was extremely bitter.  Society members would ride out on horses to greet incoming students, attempting to recruit them and dissuade them from joining the other society.  According to legend, this rivalry eventually led to dueling. The university administration eventually intervened and changed the societies' official rules, making membership based upon geography with the Phi members coming from the eastern part of the state and the Di members from the western part (see below for a detailed description of this arrangement).  Now together in a Joint Senate, the societies still maintain the rivalry in a more congenial way.

Shortly after the societies split, they each took a color.  The Dialectic Society took a light blue, today known as Carolina blue, while members of the Philanthropic Society took white.  Following a football game against the University of Virginia, in which UVA students displayed orange and blue pennants, the Societies' colors were adopted as the University's official colors.

Throughout the 19th century, the two societies engaged in an intense rivalry with each other for campus supremacy.  The Societies trained students in oration, writing, and literature. In the thirty years before the Civil War, they also invited distinguished speakers (often alumni) to address the school at graduation.  The addresses, which were multi-day graduation exercises, brought politicians, lawyers, physicians, and others to campus.  One of the most important graduation speeches came from North Carolina Supreme Court Justice William Gaston in 1832, in which he urged the end of slavery.  Those graduation speeches have proved an important source for gauging public attitudes towards union and constitutional law in North Carolina.  They illustrate that U.N.C. was substantially more moderate and more supportive of Union than other universities in the south.

It became the tradition of the societies to handle the funeral expenses of members who died while attending the University, and several members are now buried in the Societies' adjoining plots in the Old Chapel Hill Cemetery.

The Dialectic Society Chamber is located on the 3rd floor of New West Hall and the Philanthropic Society Chamber is located on the 4th floor of New East Hall. At one time, each Society's library was located on these floors with their meeting room (or the odeon) on the floor below.

The Societies suffered a steady decline in membership after the University ended the requirement that all undergraduate students be a member of one of the two societies.  In addition, in 1904, the University established an independent student government, thus taking away a large amount of the power wielded by the Societies.  By 1946, the last vestige of general student governmental power had been given over to the new Student Congress. The Societies still host an annual Student Body President debate for prospective candidates to the office of UNC Student Body President. By 1959, the Societies had joined together as a Joint Senate for the purposes of preserving their membership rolls and today maintain a steady membership.

The Societies still meet together as a Joint Senate with the members of the Philanthropic Society sitting on the north side of the Dialectic Society Chamber and members of the Dialectic Society sitting on the south side of the chamber. Each society is responsible for putting forward a slate of candidates for Joint Senate officers every semester. These officers include the President of the Joint Senate, President Pro-Tempore, Critic, Clerk, Treasurer, Sergeant-at-Arms, and Historian.

Membership 

Membership in the societies is open to all UNC students.  Students become senators by petitioning either the Dialectic or Philanthropic Society.

Determining Society 

Traditionally, the society a student petitions is determined by their county of origin.  If the student was from North Carolina, to the east of Orange County, they would petition the Philanthropic Society.  If they are from North Carolina, to the west of Orange County, they would petition the Dialectic Society.  If the student came from Orange County, or was from another state or country entirely, they could choose their society.  However, in their Fall Session of 2012, this was constitutionally altered and any prospective member has the ability to petition either society, regardless of their place of origin. Although once an integral part of determining membership, this tradition is maintained as simply that, a tradition, instead of a requirement.

Sponsorship 

When a prospective member decides to petition, they may ask any senator in the society they intend to join to act as their sponsor.  A sponsor takes on the duty of teaching the petitioner about the history and function of the societies.  It is often the case that potential petitioners will ask a senator who often participates in debates or currently in an executive position due to their visibility.

Eligibility 

To become eligible, a student must attend three meetings, including the one prior to their petitioning, and must speak at least four times. One of these speaking occasions must be a speech given during the floor speech section of the meetings program.

Petitioning Speech 

The petitioner must then deliver a petitioning speech on a topic of their choosing and field questions from the joint senate.  Queries may challenge the petitioner to defend claims that they have made in their speech.  The petitioner is also asked to complete a history section, comprised either of questioning on DiPhi history or of an oral report on a topic of DiPhi history chosen by the petitioner.  They finally participate in a round of random questions, which may be humorous and challenge the petitioner to think on their feet.  After the speech is completed, the petitioner leaves the room.  All visitors are also asked to leave, and the chambers are sealed.  Thus, the decision process is known only to active senators.  The candidate is informed of the Joint Senate's decision within a week of the petition, through a letter delivered in person by the clerk of the Joint Senate with the sponsor at a place of historical importance to the Societies.

Induction 

The induction takes place at a later time.  This is done during meetings, following the evening's program.  Again, visitors are asked to leave, and the chambers are sealed while the secret ritual is carried out.

Portraiture and furniture 

The Dialectic and Philanthropic Societies Foundation holds one of the largest privately held portrait collections in the United States, composed mainly of 19th- and early-20th-century portraits of prominent former members, many of whom held positions of power in the State of North Carolina.  It is believed that the Foundation has either the largest or second largest collection of William Garl Browne portraits in the world.

In addition, the Societies hold a number of pieces of mid-19th-century furniture in both chambers, some of which are pieces known to have been made by the famed free black furniture-maker Thomas Day.  The remainder of the pieces are likely the work of a similar furniture-maker. Further, the Philanthropic Society holds land in the Scottish Highlands.

Programs 

The Societies meet every Monday night at 7:30 post meridiem on the top floor of New West while classes are in session.  Meetings are held in the Dialectic Society Chamber, on the 3rd floor of New West, an academic building near the center of campus.  Debates are held under the guidelines of parliamentary procedure and adhere to a modified Robert's Rules of Order.   Resolutions are drafted in advance.  For each debate, four members are scheduled as speakers: a primary affirmative and primary negative, who are both given seven minutes to deliver a speech, and a secondary affirmative and secondary negative, who are both given five minutes to speak.  After delivering a speech, speakers must field queries from fellow senators and guests.

After the four scheduled speakers have finished, the President recognizes speakers from the floor.  Speakers from the floor may be members or guests.  When time has elapsed for debate, the Societies hold two votes.  The first is open to anyone in the chamber while the second is open only to active senators. Anyone may abstain from voting, although this is lightheartedly frowned upon and is usually met with hisses and jeers.  The result of the vote is entered into the Societies' archives.

Business of the Societies follows the program, Old and then New.  Reports of Officers are made at this time.

The most popular part of the meeting is known as PPMA:  Papers, Petitions, Memorials, and Addresses.  Historically, they are assigned by class, with freshman presenting Papers, sophomore Petitions, and so forth; however, anyone is free to speak on any topic.  Since this portion of the evening often has the most speakers, time limits are generally kept at five minutes; decorum suggests the speaker requests an extension before beginning to speak.  There are no time limits for Memorials.

The Report of the Critic concludes the meeting; members and interested guests then adjourn to the top floor of New East for light refreshment and to foster the "bonds of amity."

The Societies also regularly hold special programs outside of their regular meetings. The Margaret Evans Lerche Lecture, named for the first female president of either society, is a formal lecture which seeks to enlighten the University community regarding its past, traditionally given on the evening of University Day. The Mangum Medal is the oldest student-given award at UNC. It is the Chancellor’s Award for oratory, given each year to a graduating senior. This award is managed by the Societies, who typically determine the winner of the medal based on an oratorical competition. Poe By Candlelight is a literary event held each year around Halloween, celebrating macabre poetry and other frightening literature, particular that of Edgar Allen Poe.

Positions within the Joint Senate
President: This individual presides over all meetings and maintains the authority to pass or deny any motions per the voting of the Joint Senate. This individual also attends all committee meetings and supports the committees in their various tasks.

President Pro Tempore: This individual is the constitutional officer and essentially the vice president of the Joint Senate. They chair the Executive Committee and the Constitutional Committee and are responsible for maintaining order at meetings.

Critic: This individual is responsible for critiquing and scoring the speeches that are presented during meetings. They offer notes and any suggestions or commentaries they would like to share upon the conclusion of the debate. The Critic is also able to appoint a Recensioner to assist with the planning of programs and with other responsibilities of the Critic.

Clerk: This individual is tasked with taking the minutes of meetings, managing the Societies' correspondence, and depositing records in the Societies' archives. The Clerk is also able to appoint a Correspondent to assist with the Societies' communications and with other responsibilities of the Clerk.

Treasurer: This individual is tasked with collecting dues from members of the Societies and with managing the Societies' finances. However, they cannot chair the Finance Committee.

Sergeant at Arms: This individual is responsible for maintaining the Societies' chambers and book and portrait collections. The SAA is also able to appoint a Curator to assist with maintaining the Societies' portrait collection and library and with other responsibilities of the SAA.

Historian: This individual is charged with knowing and upholding the traditions and customs of the Societies. The Historian is also able to appoint an Archivist to assist with maintaining the genealogical records of the Societies and with other responsibilities of the Historian.

President of the Dialectic Society: This individual is responsible for representing the Dialectic Society at meetings and on the Executive Committee.

Speaker of the Philanthropic Society: This individual is responsible for representing the Philanthropic Society at meetings and on the Executive Committee.

Committees
Various committees have been constitutionally approved by the Joint Senate along with several ad hoc committees as well that all function to efficiently help maintain the Di Phi organization.

Executive Committee: This committee is constituted of all officers of the joint senate and the society presidents. They are tasked with various issues that pertain to the organization as a whole. The Executive Committee is chaired ex officio by the President Pro Tempore.

Constitutional Committee: This committee ensures that the Societies are adhering to their Constitution. They are tasked with proposing amendments to the Constitution. The Constitutional Committee is chaired ex officio by the President Pro Tempore.

Finance Committee: Its chair and members are responsible for maintaining the budget and finances of the Joint Societies.

Membership Committee: This is the committee that actively recruits new members and encourages new and current members to maintain their membership with the organization. It is charged with handling the table at Chapel Hill's annual Fall Fest to introduce potential members to the organization and garner their interest.

Philanthropy Committee: This committee organizes the Societies' charitable endeavors.

Programs Committee: This committee is charged with the task of creating each meeting's debate topic and helping coordinate specialty topics on those respective nights. Their agenda helps guide the evening's meeting. The Programs Committee is chaired ex officio by the Critic.

Diversity Committee: This committee is responsible for increasing the diversity of the Societies.

Alumni Committee: This committee is charged with maintaining the Societies' relations with their alumni.

White and Blue Committee: This committee is responsible for overseeing the publication of the White and Blues, the Societies' literary magazine.  

Social Committee: This committee organizes all the Societies' social events, excluding the December and the April, and handles affairs with other organizations at U.N.C.

Inter-Societal Relations Committee: This committee keeps in touch with literary societies across the east coast, such as the Philolexians, the Demosthenians, the Phi-Kappas, and the Philodemics. It also organizes trips to visit these societies.

December/April Committees: These committees have the responsibility of organizing the December, the Societies' annual formal dance, or the April, the Societies' annual semi-formal dance.

Acquisitions Committee: This committee looks to acquire portraits and other properties for the Societies.

Portrait Committee: Its members are required to maintain and arrange the Societies' extensive portrait collection.

Traditions Committee: This is the committee that ensures that the Societies maintain and respect the traditions that created the organization.

Crotchety Old Senators: This committee consists of the eldest members of both societies. They are allowed—encouraged, even—to be as old and crotchety as they please.

Flag Committee: This committee seeks to establish and maintain a flag of the Societies.

Greats Committee: This committee organizes and promotes literary gatherings for members of the Societies, such as reading groups, dramatic performances of Beat poetry, and an annual Halloween event titled "Poe by Candlelight."

Misanthropic Society: By tradition, this committee is composed of three or fewer members at a time. Active Senators petition before the Joint Senate for admittance, where they give a humorous speech espousing their misanthropic tendencies in a parody of the traditional petitioning process.

Noteworthy Alumni

Dialectic Society
James K. Polk, President of the United States
Thomas Wolfe, Pulitzer Prize-winning novelist
Hatcher Hughes, Pulitzer Prize-winning dramatist
Willie P. Mangum, President pro tempore of the U.S. Senate, U.S. Senator and Congressman
William Alexander Graham, U.S. Secretary of the Navy, U.S. Senator, Governor of North Carolina
Zebulon Vance, U.S. Senator and Congressman, Governor of North Carolina
Thomas Clingman, U.S. Senator and Congressman, mountaineer, and surveyor
Sam Ervin, U.S. Senator and Congressman
David Swain, Governor of North Carolina, President of the University of North Carolina
John Motley Morehead, Governor of North Carolina, President of the North Carolina Railroad
Charles McIver, founder of U.N.C. Greensboro
Luther H. Hodges, United States Secretary of Commerce and Governor of North Carolina
John L. Sanders, drafter of the 1971 North Carolina Constitution and Dean Emeritus of the UNC School of Government
Wayne Goodwin, Chair of the North Carolina Democratic Party and former N.C. Insurance Commissioner

Philanthropic Society
William R. King, Vice President of the United States, President pro tempore of the U.S. Senate, U.S. Senator and Congressman
Paul Green, Pulitzer Prize-winning playwright
John Mason, U.S. Attorney General, U.S. Secretary of the Navy, U.S. Congressman 
James Dobbin, U.S. Secretary of the Navy, U.S. Congressman
Jacob Thompson, U.S. Secretary of the Interior, U.S. Congressman 
John Branch, U.S. Secretary of the Navy, U.S. Senator, U.S. Congressman, Governor of the Florida Territory, Governor of North Carolina
William Umstead, U.S. Senator and Congressman, Governor of North Carolina
Charles Aycock, Governor of North Carolina
John Ehringhaus, Governor of North Carolina
Marion Butler, U.S. Senator
Johnston Blakeley, U.S. Navy captain in the War of 1812
Caleb Bradham, inventor of Pepsi-Cola
William B. Ruger, firearms designer and founder of Sturm, Ruger & Co.
Mǎ Hǎidé, Maoist-era Chinese public health official
David Price, U.S. Congressman

Leadership of the Second Session of the 227th Year of the Societies (Spring 2023)

Joint Senate Leadership
Joint Senate President: Marie Thorn, Philanthropic Society 
President Pro Tempore: Logan Grodsky, Dialectic Society
Critic: Matthew Tweden, Dialectic Society
Clerk: Maddox Addy, Philanthropic Society
Treasurer: Deniz Erdal, Dialectic Society
Sergeant-at-Arms: Daniel Gallagher, Dialectic Society
Historian: Rania Alaoui, Dialectic Society

Individual Societies
Dialectic Society 
President: Callie Stevens
Censor Morum: Joseph Ellis
Recorder: Nathaniel Shue
Chamberlain: Nicole Belcher
Philanthropic Society 
Speaker: Andrew Forbes
Speaker Pro Tempore: Marie Thorn
Parliamentarian: Maddox Addy
Sergeant-at-Arms: Ryan Kalo

Other Collegiate Societies

 Philolexian Society of Columbia University
 Philomathean Society of the University of Pennsylvania
 American Whig-Cliosophic Society of Princeton University
 Philodemic Society of Georgetown University
 Washington Literary Society and Debating Union and Jefferson Literary and Debating Society of the University of Virginia
 Union-Philanthropic (Literary) Society of Hampden-Sydney College
 Demosthenian Literary Society of the University of Georgia in Athens
 Olivaint Conference of Belgium

References
 Coates, Alfred, and Coates, Gladys Hall. The Story of Student Government in the University of North Carolina at Chapel Hill, Chapel Hill: Professor Emeritus Fund. 1985. ASIN B00070WQNC.
 "Culture Corner: Di-Phi: The Oldest Organization", Carolina Review, vol. XIII, no. 6 (March 2006), p. 13.
 "The Republics of Liberty and Letters: Progress, Union, and Constitutionlism in Graduation Addresses at the Antebellum University of North Carolina"

1795 establishments in North Carolina
College literary societies in the United States
Student debating societies
Student societies in the United States
University of North Carolina at Chapel Hill student organizations